Ryan Shorthouse is a British writer, thinker and entrepreneur. He is the founder and chief executive of Bright Blue, an independent think tank for promoting Liberal Conservatism.

Life and career 
Ryan Shorthouse became the Chief Executive of Bright Blue in 2014. He was previously a Research Fellow for the Social Market Foundation and a part of the team that won Prospect magazine's Think Tank of the Year in 2012. Before 2010, he was a researcher for the Rt Hon David Willetts MP during his tenure as Shadow Education Secretary, where he authored the Conservative Party's Childhood Review.

He is also a writer and political commentator, appearing regularly on television, radio, and in print.

Shorthouse has written widely on social mobility, education, Childcare, unversities, immigration, housing , economics, welfare, and political philosophy.

Under Shorthouse's leadership, Bright Blue has grown significantly in size and impact. Bright Blue has raised over £5 million for its work, employed around 60 people and seen the adoption of over 50 original Bright Blue policies by the UK Government. Broadly, under David Cameron, Bright Blue's work helped improve education policy, especially on childcare and universities. Under Theresa May, it secured significant changes to environmental policy, including being the first centre-right organisation to call for the UK to adopt a legal net zero emissions target. Under Boris Johnson, Bright Blue helped change the post-Brexit immigration system for workers and students.

Shorthouse is a trustee of both the Early Intervention Foundation and Transforming Access and Student Outcomes in Higher Education, and a Senior Visiting Fellow of King's College London. He is also a mentor of the Social Mobility Foundation and Governor of a state secondary school in East London.

In November 2022, Shorthouse announced that he would stand down as Director and step up to Chair the think tank Bright Blue is appointing a new CEO in 2023.

Publications

Social Market Foundation

 Open Access: An independent evaluation
 Family Fortunes: the bank of mum and dad in low income families
 Risky Business: Social Impact Bonds and public services 
 A Future State of Mind: Facing up to the dementia challenge 
 Sink or Swim? The impact of the Universal Credit 
 A Better Beginning: Easing the cost of childcare
 The Parent Trap: Illustrating the growing costs of childcare
 The Class of 2010
 Disconnected: Social Mobility and the Creative Industries 
 Funding Undergraduates

Bright Blue

 An agenda for action: Reducing racial inequality in modern Britain
 A carbonless crucible? Forging a UK steel industry
 A vision for tax reform in the 2020s
 Greening UK Export Finance
 Fast track? European climate diplomacy after COP26
 Rightfully rewarded: reforming taxes on work and wealth
 No place like home: The benefits and challenges of home working
 Driving uptake: Maturing the market for electric vechiles
 Delivering net zero: Building Britain’s resilient recovery
 Framing the future: A new pensions commission
 Emission impossible? Air pollution, national governance and the transport sector
 Distant neighbours? Understanding and measuring social integration in England
 Helping Hand? Improving Universal Credit
 Clearing the air: Reducing air pollution in the West Midlands
 Individual identity
 Britain breaking barriers
 The future of London
 Conservatism and human rights
 Going part-time
 Reducing poverty
 The generation game
 How ethnic minorities think about immigration
 A manifesto for immigration
 A future without poverty
 A centre-right plan on immigration
 Understanding how Conservative voters think about immigration
 Give and take
Emission Impossible? Air pollution, national governance and the transport sector

Books 

 Tory Modernisation 2.0: The Future of the Conservative Party
 The Moderniser's Manifesto

References

External links 
 Ryan Shorthouse's website

British writers
Living people
Year of birth unknown
Year of birth missing (living people)